"Sickness and Wealth" is an episode of the BBC sitcom, Only Fools and Horses. It was the fifth episode of series 6, and was first broadcast on 5 February 1989. In the episode, Del is suffering from stomach cramps, but refuses to see a doctor. Elsewhere, Del organises a séance.

Synopsis
Del Boy is suffering from an undiagnosed illness that is giving him severe stomach pains, but he refuses to acknowledge it or to see a doctor because he has a phobia of medical professionals. He is also stressed about work; his recent line in women's summer fashion has not been selling well due to cold weather and he has been unable to pay the rent on the flat for the past three months. In spite of the fact that the Trotters are facing the possibility of eviction, Del is still living the yuppy lifestyle, eating in curry houses and bistros, and drinking and buying rounds in wine bars and pubs, building further debts.

Over a Chinese meal, Del learns that Albert's new girlfriend Elsie Partridge used to be a medium in the 1960s and thinks their bathroom is haunted due to it being so cold (though Del believes the faulty extractor fan is the more likely explanation), and he sees it as a chance to make money and the answer to his financial problems.

Having convinced Elsie Partridge, Del holds a "dummy run" séance with his friends (Trigger, Boycie, Rodney, Mike and Uncle Albert) in the hall above the Nag's Head. Mike is concerned about "messing with the forces of darkness" due to the pub being built on the site of a public grave for victims of the Great Plague, but Del and Boycie believe it to be fear-mongering. At the séance Elsie gives Boycie a message from his father that Boycie must look after his child (it was previously established that Boycie and his wife Marlene could not have children) and then gives Del a message from his late mother Joan prompting him to go to the doctors. Del still refuses to believe Elsie until Marlene announces she is pregnant, thus confirming his fears that he may be seriously unwell (the message from Joan was actually a ploy by Albert to prompt Del to do the right thing, as he tells Elsie that the only person Del would ever listen to was his mother).

Del goes to see his GP, Dr. Meadows, only to find he has left general practice and now works at the local hospital, and a young Indian woman is his replacement. Del's unhelpful quips fail to impress her and during the examination he lies to her repeatedly about his lifestyle, pretending he is a teetotal, celibate health conscious non-smoker. She sends him to hospital thinking he might have a grumbling appendix but after testing Del, the doctors dismiss this and cannot seem to diagnose his condition. In a discussion in the Nag's Head, Uncle Albert suggests it might be Green Parrot Disease.

Rodney, Albert, and Cassandra visit Del in hospital, and Del worries that he might have contracted AIDS due to his womanising past. He also finds out that the "pukka séance" was a disaster after a mix-up because of Del's posters, which led a group of punk rockers to turn up thinking they were seeing an Iron Maiden-style band instead of Elsie Partridge (though as Rodney quips "Fortunately she remained in a trance throughout the riot!").

Whilst still pondering his health, Del is approached by his former GP, Robbie Meadows. Having heard Del's name come up in conversations with his colleagues, Meadows had asked to see Del's medical file and, given Del was his former patient, was subsequently put in charge of his case. Knowing Del well, and that he is not in fact the celibate healthy man he made himself out to be to the other doctors, Meadows is quickly able to diagnose Del with having irritable bowel syndrome caused by his busy, unhealthy lifestyle. Meadows criticises Del for lying to his GP, telling him that because he had not been truthful about his lifestyle, Del had confused the doctors handling his case since they believed they were dealing with the "perfect man", and had he been honest from the start his diagnosis would have taken far less time. Warning him to actively lead a healthier lifestyle, Meadows then reveals that he telephoned the council, who have given Del some breathing space with regard to his rent arrears. He then discharges Del, who after an initial macho display of claiming that he knew he was fine all along, breaks down in tears of relief.

A few days later, back at Nelson Mandela House, a housebound Del is appalled at his muesli diet but is getting better, until Rodney comes home and announces he is getting married.

Episode Cast

Story arc
The character Elsie Partridge, mentioned in the previous episode "The Unlucky Winner Is...", makes her only appearance in this episode. She would continue to be mentioned throughout the series as Albert's "girlfriend", and in "If They Could See Us Now", it was revealed the pair had moved to the coast together.
Mickey Pearce and Jevon tell Boycie in this episode that they have started trading together; it is they who sell Del the phones that get him into trouble with the Driscoll Brothers in the following episode "Little Problems". Likewise Rodney announces his marriage, which also takes place in the next episode.
This episode also began the sub-plot of Marlene's pregnancy, changing it from Boycie and Marlene's desperation for a child. Their son Tyler would later make a number of appearances in the show and later was a character in the spin-off series The Green Green Grass.

Edits and alterations

A repeat that aired on 5 March 2013 on BBC One removed around two seconds of dialogue referring to the TV and radio personality Jimmy Savile. This was in response to sexual abuse allegations against the late DJ. However, subsequent repeats of the episode have aired uncut on the digital channel G.O.L.D.

Music
 Gail Ann Dorsey: "Where Is Your Love?"
 Texas: "I Don't Want A Lover"
 Yazz: "Fine Time"
 Then Jericho: "Big Area"
 Simply Red: "It's Only Love"

Further reading

External links

 
 

1989 British television episodes
Only Fools and Horses (series 6) episodes
Television episodes about psychic powers